Lime is a color that is a shade of yellow-green, so named because it is a representation of the color of the citrus fruit called limes.  It is the color that is in between the web color chartreuse and yellow on the color wheel. Alternate names for this color included yellow-green, lemon-lime, lime green, or bitter lime.

Lime (traditional lime green)
The first recorded use of lime green as a color name in English was in 1890.

Lime (color hex code #BFFF00) is a pure spectral color at approximately 564 nanometers on the visible spectrum when plotted on the CIE chromaticity diagram.

Variations

Key lime 

Key lime is a light lime color that is named after a Crayola Pearl Brites crayon.

Lemon-lime

Lemon-lime is a fluorescent chartreuse color that is named after the carbonated soft drinks such as Sprite, 7 Up, and Sierra Mist.

The red value to this neon color is almost to yellow.

Arctic lime

The color Arctic lime is close to electric lime, and was named in 2009. This is one of the colors in Crayola's eXtreme colors ultra-bright colored pencils.

Peridot 

The color peridot is a shade of lime with lemon undertones, which represents the color of the peridot gemstone. Peridot is the birthstone for those born in August.

Volt

The color Volt is used by Nike in several of their athletic products, most notably their Air Max 90 Hyperfuse sneakers, which were introduced in 2011. This color is similar to electric lime.

Electric lime

Electric lime is a Crayola color created in 1990. This tint of lime is popular in psychedelic art.

French lime

The color French lime is the shade of lime called "lime" in the Pourpre.com color list, a color list widely popular in France.

Web color "lime" (X11 Green)

The web color named "lime", in the CSS color scheme maintained by the World Wide Web Consortium (W3C), has the identical normalized color coordinates as the color green, as found in X11 color names formulized over 1985–1989. The web color lime / X11 color green match the green primary color of the RGB color model.

The W3C web color named green is darker than the color named green in X11, using the HTML color code #008000 as compared to the color code #00FF00 in X11. This lime versus green issue is one of the very few clashes between web and X11 colors in the CSS color scheme.

Lime green

Lime green is a vivid yellowish green web color.

Bright lime

Bright lime is a luminous vivid chartreuse green web color.

Usage

Some fire engines in the United States are lime yellow rather than red due to safety and ergonomics reasons. A 2009 study by the U.S. Fire Administration concluded that fluorescent colors, including yellow-green and orange, are easiest to spot in daylight.

In the bandana code of the gay leather subculture, wearing a lime-colored bandana means one is into the sexual fetish of sitophilia, otherwise known as food fetishism.

The National Rugby League team Canberra Raiders uses lime green as one of its main colours, as does the National Football League’s Seattle Seahawks, which utilizes a color officially named Action Green, which strongly resembles lime green.

During the 2000s, lime green was a very popular aesthetic, particularly with products, throughout the entirety of the decade. Famous examples being Song Airlines,  Crocs shoes, and the Seattle Seahawks.

See also
 List of colors

References

External links

 Lime colored limeade drinks from the cover of a 1975 cookbook

Secondary colors
Quaternary colors
Shades of green
Web colors